Walnut Hill Elementary School may refer to:
 Walnut Hill Elementary School (Dallas) - Dallas Independent School District
 Walnut Hill Elementary School (Liberty, Kentucky) - Casey County Schools
 Walnut Hill Elementary School (Omaha, Nebraska) - Omaha Public Schools
 Walnut Hill Elementary School (Petersburg, Virginia) - Petersburg City Public Schools
 Walnut Hill Elementary/Middle School (Shreveport, Louisiana) - Caddo Public Schools (Louisiana)

See also
 Walnut Hill School, Natick, Massachusetts
 Walnut Hills Elementary School (Centennial, Colorado) - Cherry Creek Public Schools